Susan Jean "Sue" Woodstra (born May 21, 1957) is an American retired female volleyball player and coach who won the silver medal with the USA National Women's Team at the 1984 Summer Olympics in Los Angeles, California.

Playing days
At the collegiate level, Woodstra earned All-American honors at USC and played eight years on the United States women's national volleyball team, serving as captain for four years, including for the 1984 Olympic silver medal team. Woodstra also played professional volleyball from 1984 to 1988 for the NEC Red Rockets of the Japan V.League. She also played three season owith the Merrill Lynch/Reebok USVBA team where she earned MVP honors.

Her number 4 hangs on a banner in the volleyball court in USC's Galen Center, along with Tim Hovland's number 10.

Coaching

Woodstra entered coaching as an assistant at Arizona State in 1995 until she was hired as the head coach of the University of Pittsburgh Panthers women's volleyball team in 1989 where she served as head coach until 1992. During her tenure, she led her teams to Big East Conference Tournament Championships in each season as well as three Big East regular season championships, winning the regular season each year from when the Big East instituted round-robin play in 1990. She also led the Panthers to four post-season appearances including one Women's Invitation Volleyball Championship appearance in 1989 in which Pitt finished third, and three NCAA volleyball tournaments, including in 1990 where Pitt reached the regional semifinal and finished ranked 18th in the final American Volleyball Coaches Association (AVCA) Coaches poll. Woodstra's earned Big East Coach of the Year honors in 1990. Her NCAA tournament teams were led by standout second team All-American outside hitter Ann Marie Lucanie, who won multiple Big East Tournament MVP awards and Big East Player of the Year awards. In total, Woodstra compiled an overall record of 110–39 (.738) over four seasons as head coach.

After her tenure at Pitt, Woodstra became the head coach of the SC Münster women's profession volleyball team in Münster, Germany, and led the team to a CEV Cup championship in 1992. She then served as a volunteer assistant coach at Notre Dame for one season before taking over as the head coach of University of California, Berkeley Golden Bears volleyball team from 1995 to 1998. In 1999, Woodstra was hired as an assistant coach at Florida State before serving as the head coach of Humboldt State University Lumberjacks from 2002 to 2012.

Woodstra took a leave of absence from coaching at Humboldt State in 2007 and the beginning of 2008 in order to serve as the head coach of U.S. women's national volleyball team in 2007 and an assistant coach during the 2008 Olympics. In 2007, she led the team to a bronze medal at the Pan American games. Woostra served as the first assistant coach for the silver-medal winning U.S. Olympic women's team in 2008.

Woodstra was inducted into the American Volleyball Coaches Association Hall of Fame in 2006.

References

External links
 

1957 births
American volleyball coaches
American women's volleyball players
Living people
Medalists at the 1984 Summer Olympics
Olympic silver medalists for the United States in volleyball
People from Colton, California
Pittsburgh Panthers volleyball coaches
Volleyball players at the 1984 Summer Olympics
USC Trojans women's volleyball players
Pan American Games medalists in volleyball
Pan American Games silver medalists for the United States
Medalists at the 1983 Pan American Games
Arizona State Sun Devils women's volleyball coaches
Notre Dame Fighting Irish women's volleyball coaches